The  is an electric multiple unit (EMU) train type operated by the private railway operator Seibu Railway on commuter services in the Tokyo area of Japan since 1977.

Design
The 2000 series trains were introduced on local train services on the Seibu Shinjuku Line in 1977, featuring four pairs of sliding doors on each side to speed up boarding and alighting at stations. 130 vehicles were built between 1977 and 1988, including some replacements for cars damaged in accidents, and this first batch was followed by a batch of 304 vehicles classified "New 2000 series" built between 1988 and 1992.

Fleet
, the fleet consists of 290 vehicles formed as two-car, four-car, six-car, and eight-car sets, and based at Kotesashi, Musashigaoka, Minami-Iriso, Tamagawa-Josui depots for use on Seibu Shinjuku Line and Seibu Ikebukuro Line workings.

Formations
Sets are formed as two-car, four-car, six-car, and eight-car sets, as shown below.

Two-car sets

The "Mc" cars each have two pantographs.

Four-car sets

The "M3" cars each have two lozenge-type pantographs.

Six-car sets

The "M1" and "M5" cars each have two single-arm pantographs.

Eight-car sets

The "M3", "M3", and "M5" cars each have one pantograph.

Interior
Seating consists of longitudinal bench seating throughout. Priority seats are provided at the end of each car.

2000 series

New 2000 series

History
The first trains entered service in 1977 on the Seibu Shinjuku Line, initially formed as six-car sets.

The last early-model 2000 series eight-car set, 2007, was withdrawn in April 2022.

Renewal

From new 2000 series train sets that were more than 20 years after they were made, a renewal and some fixing of the parts were started. The first renewal was made to the train set 2047 (6 cars) and started renewaling in December 2007 and finished in March 2008. The renewal contents are:

Exterior 
 Changing the pantographs to Single-arm type.
 Making the part that shows the destination of the train full-coler LED.
 In the front, there made a plate that indicated the train set's number (example, 2077).
 On the side, they changed the part that shows the number of the train set to a plate and removed some windows.
 To stop passengers from falling into the train tracks, in some of the train sets, they placed a speaker that warns passengers. 
 Exchanging the horn.

Interior 
 Making the floor rug to a grey rubber and in places close to the doors, the coler of the floor to yellow. This rubber matirial is resistant to fire and it won't let out poisenous gas out when there's a fire.
 Making the normal seats to blue, and made the priority seats to purple-fire resistant material. Similar to Seibu 30000 series, used the S-spring to the cushion material. Also made the curtains of the windows to a new one.
 Made the roof's air conditioning part to hard plastic from metal. Also, made advertisment place to the part they formerly had windows.
 Newly made door chime and changing the door engine and also made LED scroll to let passengers know information.
 Newly made wheelchair space and some other parts.

Withdrawal
Due to the accident that happened in 1986 at Tanashi Station, train set 2017, 2023, 2407, 2415 were damaged, and rolling stock 2017, 2117, 2118, 2217, 2224, 2024, 2415, and 2416 were withdrawn.

From 2015, withdrawal of the 2000 series was started.

In September 2016, New 2000 series train set 2097 was withdrawn. This was the first new 2000 series to be withdrawn.

In January 2017, train set 2005 was withdrawn. In March 2017, train set 2015 was withdrawn; there were then no withdrawals until March 2019, when train set 2021 was withdrawn.  

After that, there were no withdrawals until April 2021, when train set 2003 was withdrawn.。After that, in October 2021, train set 2407, and the first 2000 series that was made, train set 2001 were withdrawn, and in November, train set 2411 and 2063 were withdrawn.

On February 2022, train set 2411 and 2519 were withdrawn, which made it the first 4-car set to be withdrawn. Also, train set 2521 was withdrawn in March.

In April 2022, the last 8-cars set of 2000 series, (not new 2000 series) was withdrawn after having some special stickers and a headmark. There was some tour trains run before withdrawal as well.

After that, there was some more withdrawals, and in July 2022, train set 2059, 2413, and the first new 2000 series made, 2501 were withdrawn.

On August 2022, train set 2033 was withdrawn. This is the first renewed 2000 series to be withdrawn.
On October 2022, train set 2027 was withdrawn, and the last train set to have 3-color LED became train set 10112 of Seibu 10000 series.

Preserved examples

The cab end of former car Kuha 2098 is preserved inside the Maruzen Ikebukuro bookshop in Toshima, Tokyo. Built in June 1992 at Seibu Railway's Tokorozawa factory, it was withdrawn in September 2016, and moved to the ground floor of the Maruzen Ikebukuro bookshop building in March 2017, while still under construction.

Notes

References

Bibliography

External links

 Seibu 2000 series train information 

Electric multiple units of Japan
2000 series
Train-related introductions in 1977
Tokyu Car multiple units
1500 V DC multiple units of Japan